Zebina malagazzae is a species of minute sea snail, a marine gastropod mollusk or micromollusk in the family Zebinidae.

Distribution
This species occurs in the Pacific Ocean off the Society Islands and Tuamotu.

References

malagazzae
Gastropods described in 2002